This is a partial list of notable social democrats.

List 

 C. N. Annadurai
 Daniel Andrews
 Jacinda Ardern
 Clement Attlee
 Vincent Auriol
 Obafemi Awolowo
 Oliver Baldwin
 José Batlle y Ordóñez
 Adam Bandt
 Gustav Bauer
 Otto Bauer(Classical) 
 David Ben-Gurion
 Victor L. Berger
 Ingmar Bergman
 Eduard Bernstein(Classical) 
 Zulfikar Ali Bhutto
 Robert Blatchford
 Hjalmar Branting
 Ed Broadbent
 Gordon Brown
 Gro Harlem Brundtland
 James Callaghan
 Lázaro Cárdenas
 Francisco de Sá Carneiro
 Ben Chifley
 Helen Clark
 Job Cohen
 Brendan Corish
 Anthony Crosland
 António Costa
 John Curtin
 Hugh Dalton
 Richard Di Natale
 Tommy Douglas
 Willem Drees
 Alexander Dubček
 Friedrich Ebert
 Friedrich Engels(Classical) 
 Tage Erlander
 Tim Farron
 Peter Fraser
 Mette Frederiksen
 Hugh Gaitskell
 Indira Gandhi
 Mahatma Gandhi
 Einar Gerhardsen
 Ciro Gomes
 Mikhail Gorbachev
 Tarja Halonen
 Per Albin Hansson
 Keir Hardie
 Michael Harrington
 Bob Hawke
 Rudolf Hilferding
 Morris Hillquit
 Daniel Hoan
 Sidney Hook
 Christopher Hornsrud
 Ekrem İmamoğlu
 Erdal İnönü
 Karl Kautsky(Classical) 
 Paul Keating
 Joan Kirner
 Thorbjørn Jagland
 Roy Jenkins
 Anker Jørgensen
 M. Karunanidhi
 Charles Kennedy
 Alexander Kerensky
 Anna Kéthly
 Kemal Kılıçdaroğlu
 Martin Luther King Jr.
 Norman Kirk
 Bruno Kreisky
 Wim Kok
 Oskar Lafontaine
 Ferdinand Lassalle
 Jack Layton
 Vladimir Lenin(Classical) 
 René Lévesque
 David Lewis
 Karl Liebknecht(Classical) 
 Theodor Liebknecht(Classical) 
 Wilhelm Liebknecht(Classical) 
 Paavo Lipponen
 Huey Long
 Rosa Luxemburg(Classical) 
 Vassos Lyssarides
 Sicco Mansholt
 Julius Martov
 Karl Marx(Classical) 
 Malcolm MacDonald
 Ramsay MacDonald
 Dom Mintoff
 Evo Morales
 Hermann Müller
 Tomiichi Murayama
 Alva Myrdal
 Gunnar Myrdal
 Walter Nash
 Jawaharlal Nehru
 Pietro Nenni
 Johan Nygaardsvold
 Sandro Pertini
 Romano Prodi
 Carlos Alvarado Quesada
 Yitzhak Rabin
 Poul Nyrup Rasmussen
 Walter Reuther
 Maximilien de Robespierre(Radicalism) 
 Roh Hoe-chan
 Noe Ramishvili
 Carlo Rosselli
 Bayard Rustin
 Giuseppe Saragat
 Michael Joseph Savage
 Philipp Scheidemann
 Willem Schermerhorn
 Helmut Schmidt
 Bill Shorten
 Jóhanna Sigurðardóttir
 Jagmeet Singh 
 Mário Soares
 Luis Guillermo Solís
 Hugo Chávez
 Kalevi Sorsa
 Paul-Henri Spaak
 Thorvald Stauning
 Jens Stoltenberg
 Frans Timmermans
 Pieter Jelles Troelstra
 Filippo Turati
 Sidney Webb
 Harold Wilson
 Gough Whitlam
 Joop den Uyl
 Shelly Yachimovich
 Frank Zeidler
 Noe Zhordania
 Bülent Ecevit

Head of state  

 François Mitterrand
 François Hollande
 Dilma Rousseff
 Luiz Inácio Lula da Silva

Head of government 

 Léon Blum
 Willy Brandt
 Felipe González
 Olof Palme
 Pedro Sánchez
 José Luis Rodríguez Zapatero

Legislature  

 Jean Jaurès
 Alexandria Ocasio-Cortez
 Bernie Sanders

References

Citations

Sources 

 
 
 
 
 
 
 
 
 
 
 
 
 
 
 
 
 
 
 
 
 
 
 
 
 
 
 
 
 

Social democracy
Socialism
Social democrats